Madeline Amy Sweeney (December 14, 1965 – September 11, 2001) was an American flight attendant who was killed when American Airlines Flight 11 was deliberately crashed into the World Trade Center by hijackers during the September 11 attacks.

American Airlines Flight 11
On September 11, 2001, Sweeney, who had been a flight attendant for 12 years, was asked by American Airlines to take an extra shift because the other crew member, who was assigned to the position, was ill. Normally, she would only work part-time on weekends.

At approximately 7:15 a.m., before the plane had taken off, Sweeney made a cellular telephone call to her husband Mike, from the plane – which he deemed to be "highly unusual". She was feeling low about being at work and missing out on a chance to see their five-year old daughter Anna, a kindergartner, off to school. Mike comforted her by saying she'd have plenty of days ahead to see their kids off to school. After the plane was hijacked, she relayed a report on the phone with manager Michael Woodward of the seat numbers of the hijackers, which later helped investigators to determine their identities. Sweeney said that one of the hijackers had shown her a device with red and yellow wires that appeared to be a bomb.

At 8:46 a.m., Sweeney was on the phone with Woodward when the plane crashed into the North Tower: "I see water. I see buildings. I see buildings! We are flying low. We are flying very, very low. We are flying way too low. Oh my God we are flying way too low. Oh my God!" She was survived by her husband and their two children.

Legacy 

On February 11, 2002, Sweeney was commemorated in a series of new annual bravery awards initiated by the Government of Massachusetts. The annual Madeline Amy Sweeney Award for Civilian Bravery is awarded every September 11 to at least one Massachusetts resident who displayed extraordinary courage in defending or saving the lives of others. The first recipients were Sweeney, Flight 11 Captain John Ogonowski, and Sweeney's fellow flight attendant, Betty Ong, who had also relayed information about the hijacking to personnel on the ground. They were all residents of Massachusetts. Relatives of all three accepted the awards on their behalf.

Sweeney is commemorated in the National September 11 Memorial & Museum on panel N-74 at the North Pool.

References

External links 

 

American Airlines Flight 11 victims
1965 births
2001 deaths
American Airlines people
American terrorism victims
Flight attendants
People from Acton, Massachusetts